Student Day is the anniversary of the murder of three students of University of Tehran on December 7, 1953 (16 Azar 1332 in the Iranian calendar) by Iranian police in the Pahlavi era.

This day is held to commemorate the three students who were killed on Azar 16th , 1332, due to protesting the official visit of Richard Nixon, the vice president of the United States at the time, and also the resumption of relations between Iran and Britain. The main reason for students' opposition to Nixon was the Mordad 28th coup and the overthrow of Mossadegh's government . Every year on the 16th of Azar, the memory of that day is kept alive with a ceremony held by various students in all universities around Iran and some other countries. 

Every year there are local demonstrations at many universities organised by students with democratic demands. Besides academic rights like freedom of speech and academic independence from the government, they often also reflect broader democratic movements in Iran, for instance during the 2009 Green Movement, uprising in 2020 and yet the largest  during 2022 Mahsa Amini (Woman, Life, Freedom) protests. The government also organises gatherings and demonstrations on campuses which sometimes clashes with student-organised protests. 

The day is commemorated by various sections of the student movement in Iran, including Leftist, Islamic, and Nationalist groups. It also was commemorated outside of Iran by the Confederation of Iranian Students for years after 1953. The Confederation played a critical role at that time when the student movement inside the country was under severe pressure. A monthly bulletin published by the Confederation was also titled "Azar 16". The 2022 date is December 7.

The Initial Incident 
Ahmad Ghandchi who belonged to Jebhe-e Melli (Nationalist Front) and two other students, Shariat-Razavi and Bozorg-Nia who were claimed by Hezb-e Tudeh (a communist Party), were killed when the Shah's police forces opened fire on the students of University of Tehran going on strike in protest at the resumption of Iran's relations with Great Britain and Richard Nixon's visit to Iran, following the coup d'état of 1953.

During the 2009 Green Movement 
On the anniversary of Student Day in 2009, large student protests broke out in opposition to the 2009 Iranian Presidential election. Following the December 7, 2009 Student Day protests in Iran, Heshmat Tabarzadi published an opinion piece in the Wall Street Journal, writing, "One thing is certain: Dec. 7 proved that the movement for a free, democratic Iran is robust and only growing in strength. If the government continues to opt for violence, there very well may be another revolution in Iran. One side has to step down. And that side is the government—-not the people."

See also
Timeline of the 2009 Iranian election protests #December 7''.
Iran student protests, July 1999
Pupil Day (Iran)

References

Observances set by the Solar Hijri calendar
November observances
December observances
Winter events in Iran